Lost media are pieces of media that are nonexistent, missing, or unavailable to the general public. The term lost media primarily encompasses visual, audio, or audiovisual media such as films, television and radio broadcasts, music, and video games. Lost artworks and lost literary works may also fit into this umbrella term, although lost works is a more common expression in these cases.

Since the advent of streaming media on the Internet, use of the term lost media has concentrated on those pieces of mass media that have not surfaced on the World Wide Web or streaming services. Such media—primarily recorded onto magnetic tape in the case of television and radio broadcast masters—may be entirely lost due to the industry practice of wiping (broadcast media was often considered ephemeral and of little historical worth before the rise of home media in the late 1970s). Others are known to exist but are hard to access outside of archives such as the Library of Congress of the United States and private collections. The Lost Media Wiki, a wiki site founded by Daniel "Dycaite" Wilson in 2012, has spearheaded the search for numerous pieces of lost media, primarily obscure or unaired television programs, but also commercials, music, books and video games.

Preservation efforts attempt to avoid the complete loss of works; this is usually done by storing them in archives, one example being the Arctic World Archive, which has been the chosen location for the preservation of the code on public repositories on GitHub along with a wide range of data of interest to multiple companies, institutions and governments; including the Constitutions of Brazil and Norway.

Lost film 

Lost works seem to encompass a large portion of silent films made in the United States. A 2013 report made by the United States Library of Congress estimates that 70 percent of silent films made in the United States have been completely lost.

Lost television broadcast

Lost video games
Video games, including digital downloads, are often known to have fade from existence due to the digital game store’s closure, such as Wii Shop Channel and V Cast Network. The infamous P.T., a teaser to the unreleased Silent Hills game, became un-reloadable after its removal from the PlayStation Network in about a year. There were fan attempts, but were blocked from doing so due to legal issues with Konami, receiving controversy ever since. The Nintendo 3DS digital download game Dodge Club Pocket was removed from Nintendo eShop in 2022 and became publicly unavailable due to controlling issues. The App Store is known to have gained infamy with the removal of the apps and games. When a publisher closes the page, the previous purchased apps are permanently lost.

Lost electronic data 

Data stored in electronic computers risks being lost if it is not frequently migrated into more recent file formats. This happens because as new computer systems are developed and new technologies are built, now obsolete systems may break down over time, leaving the data inside inaccesible. Electronic data preservation is further complicated by the fact that unless an emulator for a given computer system which can decode the data is present at the time of the preservation, the original data may become inaccessible as the original hardware breaks down, as it may depend on the original hardware to be decoded, although in some cases the original data may be recoverable through lengthy reverse engineering work with the objective of understanding the original computer system enough to decode the most original electronic data possible.

See also
 :Category:Lost works
 Lost artworks
 Lost literary work
 Rare groove
 Archival science
 Media archaeology
 Media preservation
 Data archaeology
 Data preservation
 Digital preservation
 Orphan work

References

Further reading